Essostrutha laeta is a species of beetle in the family Cerambycidae. It was described by Newman in 1840. It is known from Guatemala, Mexico, and the United States.

References

Hemilophini
Beetles described in 1840